Two ships of United States Navy were named USS Eisele:

 , an 
 , a 

United States Navy ship names